Adam Kane is an American cinematographer, film director, television director and producer.

Since the 1990s, Kane has amassed cinematography credits for the films Hail Caesar, The Boondock Saints, The Man, Skinwalkers and a number of other films.

In 2005, he transitioned to directing, starting with the short film The Fix starring Robert Patrick, a film that won numerous awards. As a television director, his credits include Pushing Daisies, My Own Worst Enemy, Supernatural, Kings, Mercy, Heroes, The Mentalist, Haven, Being Human, Hannibal, 24: Live Another Day, Daredevil, Supergirl, and Star Trek: Discovery.

In 2009, Kane directed the film Formosa Betrayed starring James Van Der Beek''.

He is an alumnus of New York University's Tisch School of the Arts and the AFI Conservatory.

He was married to actress Leslie Hope.

References

External links

American cinematographers
AFI Conservatory alumni
American film producers
American television directors
Television producers from California
Living people
People from Burbank, California
Tisch School of the Arts alumni
Film directors from California
Year of birth missing (living people)